Johnny Fuller (April 20, 1929 – May 20, 1985) was an American West Coast and electric blues singer and guitarist. Fuller showed musical diversity, performing in several musical genres including rhythm and blues, gospel and rock and roll.  His distinctive singing and guitar playing appeared on a number of 1950s San Francisco Bay Area recordings, although he ceased performing regularly by the late 1970s. He worked as an auto mechanic from 1968 to 1983. His best known recording, "Haunted House", was later covered with some success by Jumpin' Gene Simmons. His other better known tracks were "Crying Won't Make Me Stay", "All Night Long", "You Got Me Whistling" and "Johnny Ace's Last Letter."

He is not to be confused with, nor was he related to, the American blues musician Jesse Fuller.

Biography
Fuller was born in Edwards, Mississippi. He relocated with his family to Vallejo, California, in 1945.

His musical styling often masked his upbringing in the Deep South, but he spent most of his life in the San Francisco Bay Area. As such, he is usually classified as a West Coast bluesman, although he did not stick with one particular genre. Fuller recorded for a number of independent record labels, sometimes those associated with Bob Geddins. These included Heritage, Hollywood, Flair, Specialty, Aladdin, Imperial and Checker Records. His debut recording was made in 1948 on the obscure Jaxyson record label, with a couple of gospel-based songs. In 1954, he began a regular recording career that lasted until 1962. He recorded twenty sides for Geddins in 1954 alone.

Fuller had local hits with the singles "All Night Long" and the original version of "Haunted House," the latter of which was written and produced by Geddins. With his ability to switch styles, Fuller performed in late-1950s rock-and-roll package tours, on the same bill as Paul Anka and Frankie Avalon. However, this same factor lost his black audience, and he was overlooked in the 1960s blues revival.

In 1974, Fuller issued his debut album, Fuller's Blues, which was well received but had little commercial success. Fuller played at the San Francisco Blues Festival in 1973 and 1977.

He later worked as a mechanic in a local garage.

Fuller died of lung cancer in Oakland, California, in May 1985, at the age of 56.

Discography

Albums

Singles
See "External links" for a full listing.

See also
List of West Coast blues musicians

References

External links
Illustrated American Music discography
Extensive Fuller discography at Koti.mbnet.fi
 

1929 births
1985 deaths
American blues singers
American blues guitarists
Electric blues musicians
West Coast blues musicians
American rhythm and blues singers
American rhythm and blues guitarists
American male guitarists
American gospel singers
People from Edwards, Mississippi
Musicians from the San Francisco Bay Area
Deaths from lung cancer in California
20th-century American singers
Singers from California
20th-century American guitarists
Guitarists from California
20th-century American male singers
Aladdin Records artists
Checker Records artists
Imperial Records artists
Specialty Records artists